Columbicola is a genus of lice belonging to the family Philopteridae.

The species of this genus are found in Europe, Northern America, Southeastern Asia and Australia.

Species

Species:

Columbicola adamsi 
Columbicola altamimiae 
Columbicola asukae 
Columbicola extinctus

References

Lice